Asfordby railway station was a station serving the villages of Asfordby and Kirby Bellars in Leicestershire. The station was situated at a level crossing on the road between the two villages. It opened in 1846 and was originally named Kirby, but had been renamed Asfordby by 1863. It closed to passengers in 1951 but remained in use for goods until 1964.

History
It was opened by the Midland Railway on the Syston and Peterborough Railway. The station building were designed by the architects William Parsons and Sancton Wood. The contractors Norman and Grimson undertook to build it for £744 8s 6d. and it was remarkably similar to the station at Rearsby.

It became part of the London, Midland and Scottish Railway during the Grouping of 1923. The station then passed on to the London Midland Region of British Railways on nationalisation in 1948. It was then closed by the British Railways Board.

Stationmasters
Charles Allen 1847 - 1892
H. Ellis 1892 - 1899 (formerly station master at Moira)
William Williamson 1899 - 1928
W. Stephenson 1933 - 1935 (afterwards station master at Annesley)
Walter Wilson 1935
H.E. Harrison ca. 1945

The site today
Trains still pass the site on the Birmingham to Peterborough line.

References

External links
 Station on navigable O.S. map

Former Midland Railway stations
Disused railway stations in Leicestershire
Railway stations in Great Britain opened in 1846
Railway stations in Great Britain closed in 1951
1846 establishments in England